Lakhlan (name originated from Lakhi Jungle) is a community of eight villages(now left seven as no family of this clan is living in village Sudhiwas) in Behal  tehsil, Bhiwani district, Haryana state, India. Behal and Siwani are nearby markets for these villages. Lakhlan are Jat by caste and main occupation is agriculture. This community has passion for joining defence forces and contributing towards national security. Dada Bhomiya is the totem of this clan and a huge temple is built in village Patwan. Origin place of this clan is from Lakhi Jungle. This clan moved to village Patwan in around 1200 CE. 
The name of these eight villages as given below:
 Patwan
 Garwa
 Mithi
 Morka
 Sudhiwas (No family of this clan is living now in this village)
 Surpura Khurd
 Surpura Kalan 
 Behal ki Dhaani
Mandholi khurd

A branch of this clan moved from Lakhi Jungle can be found in Kanwar Pura Village, Sirsa District, Haryana.

References
Villages in Bhiwani district